Cheri Dennis (born August 7, 1979), is an American R&B singer from Cleveland, Ohio.

Early life
Cheri Dennis was born and raised in Cleveland, Ohio and was initially a member of a girl group named Spoyled.  When the group broke up, Dennis left Shaker Heights and moved to New York where she began her recording career.

Career
Dennis first appeared on the Mase tracks "No Matter What", "All I Ever Wanted" and "If You Want to Party" from his album Double Up (1999), after running into Diddy during a party in New York City. After appearing briefly on Puff Daddy's Forever album ("Is This the End? (Pt. 2)") also in 1999, in 2001 she reappeared signed to Bad Boy Entertainment with her first solo track "So Complete" from the P. Diddy and The Bad Boy Family album "The Saga Continues...". Afterwards she was heard on several mixtapes, before finally releasing her first single, the Ryan Leslie produced track "I Love You", in fall 2005. The music video was filmed in March 2006 before premiering on BET's 106 & Park on May 1. "I Love You" peaked at No. 38 on Billboard's Hot R&B/Hip-Hop Singles & Tracks. Dennis' second single "Portrait of Love" peaked at No. 55 before her debut album In and Out of Love finally released in February 2008, debuting at No. 74 on the Billboard 200. Her song "Ooh La La" was originally used as an opener for Making The Band 3, which suggested that the final band recorded the song. The girls often referred to the song in competitions.

She now goes by Cheri Coke and has collaborated with MeLo-X on "The Garden of Eden", it is a part of the tracklist that will appear on Dennis's second album "X/COKE".

Discography
Studio albums
 In and Out of Love (2008) 
 X/COKE (2020)

Guest appearances

References

External links

1979 births
Living people
African-American women singer-songwriters
American dance musicians
American hip hop singers
American rhythm and blues singer-songwriters
American soul singers
Atlantic Records artists
Bad Boy Records artists
American women hip hop musicians
Musicians from Shaker Heights, Ohio
Singer-songwriters from Ohio
20th-century African-American women singers
21st-century African-American women singers